The Czech Republic national football team, recognised by FIFA as Czechia, represents the Czech Republic in international football. The team is controlled by the Football Association of the Czech Republic (FAČR). Historically, the team participated in FIFA and UEFA competitions as Bohemia and Czechoslovakia.

Following the dissolution of Czechoslovakia, the first international competition of the Czech Republic was UEFA Euro 1996, where they finished runners-up and they have taken part at every European Championship since. Following the separation, they have featured at one FIFA World Cup, the 2006 tournament.

History

1990s
When Czechoslovakia split  into the Czech Republic and Slovakia, the Czech Republic team was formed. They played their first friendly match away to Turkey on 23 February 1994. The newly formed team played their first home game in Ostrava, against Lithuania, in which they registered their first home win.

Their first competitive match was part of the UEFA Euro 1996 qualifying campaign, in which they defeated Malta 6–1 in Ostrava. During the campaign, the Czech Republic registered six wins, three draws, and a defeat against Luxembourg, finishing their qualifying Group 5 in first place, ahead of group favourites the Netherlands. In the final tournament, hosted by England, the Czechs progressed from the group stage, despite a 2–0 opening game defeat to Germany. They progressed to the UEFA Euro 1996 Final, losing 2–1 to Germany at Wembley Stadium.

The Czechs finished third in the 1998 FIFA World Cup qualifying group, behind Spain and Yugoslavia, and subsequently missed the tournament.

2000s
The Czech Republic qualified for Euro 2000, winning all of their group games and conceding five goals. In the finals the team were drawn in Group D, alongside France, the Netherlands and Denmark. The team lost to the Netherlands after last-minute penalty and lost the second match against France, which eliminated them from advancing to the knockout round. The Czech Republic managed a 2–0 win against Denmark in their final game courtesy of two goals from Vladimír Šmicer.

Once again, the Czech Republic failed to qualify for the World Cup, this time finishing second in their 2002 qualification group, behind Denmark, and then being beaten 1–0 in both legs by Belgium in the UEFA play-offs for a place in the finals.

A team settled with Pavel Nedvěd, Jan Koller, Tomáš Rosický, Milan Baroš, Marek Jankulovski, Tomáš Galásek together with the emergence of goalkeeper Petr Čech were unbeaten in 2002 and 2003, scoring 53 goals in 19 games and qualifying for Euro 2004 in the process. The Czech Republic went on a 20-game unbeaten streak, which finally ended in Dublin on 31 March 2004 in a friendly match against the Republic of Ireland. The Czechs entered the Euro finals in Group D, alongside the Netherlands, Germany and Latvia. The team trailed 2–0 to the Netherlands before winning the game 3–2 and beat Germany in the final group match. The Czech Republic beat Denmark in the quarter-final, went into the semi-final against Greece and Tomáš Rosický hit the bar after just two minutes, Jan Koller had shots saved by the Greek goalkeeper and Pavel Nedvěd left the pitch injured in the end of the first half. It was not to be as the 90 minutes finished goalless and Greece won the game in the last minute of the first half of extra-time with a silver goal.

The Czech Republic achieved their record win during the 2006 FIFA World Cup qualification (UEFA), thrashing Andorra 8–1 in a qualification match in Liberec. In the same match, Jan Koller became the all-time top scorer for the national team with his 35th international goal. At the end of the campaign, after finishing in second place in Group 1 then defeating Norway in a playoff, the Czechs qualified for their first FIFA World Cup. The team was boosted prior to the play-off matches by the return of Pavel Nedvěd, who had initially retired from international football after Euro 2004. The squad for the 2006 World Cup in Germany included 18 of the Euro 2004 team which reached the semi-finals. With the team ranked second in the world, they started the tournament with a 3–0 win over the United States. During the game, however, Jan Koller was forced to leave with a hamstring injury, putting him out of the tournament. In the next game, with Koller absent and Milan Baroš still recovering from injury, the team suffered a 2–0 loss to Ghana. Baroš returned for the final game against Italy which the Czechs had to win to progress. The team were reduced to ten men as Jan Polák was dismissed before half-time for two bookable offences. Italy went on to win 2–0. Pavel Nedvěd, Karel Poborský and Vratislav Lokvenc retired from the national team after this tournament.

In the qualifying campaign for Euro 2008, they finished top of their group, above Germany on head-to-head records. The Czech Republic beat co-hosts Switzerland 1–0 in their opening game of the final tournament, before being beaten 3–1 by Portugal, meaning that they and Turkey carried identical records going into the final group game. Although the Czechs took a 2–0 lead just past the hour mark and looked set to qualify, Turkey scored three goals in the final 15 minutes of the game to win the game 3–2.

The Czechs faced World Cup qualification, being drawn in Group 3, under the guidance of coach Petr Rada. They started with a 0–0 away draw against Northern Ireland, before losing to Poland. A late goal from Libor Sionko won the next game 1–0 against Slovenia. This was followed by a win against San Marino, and a goalless draw in Slovenia. In their following match, against neighbours Slovakia, a 2–1 defeat at home left Czech Republic in a precarious qualifying position. Manager Petr Rada was dismissed and six players were suspended. Ivan Hašek took temporary charge as manager, gaining four points from his first two matches, as the team drew away to group leaders Slovakia and thrashed San Marino 7–0 in Uherské Hradiště. They subsequently beat Poland in Prague but followed this result with a goalless draw against Northern Ireland, finishing third in the group and failing to qualify for the World Cup. Hašek announced his immediate resignation.

2010s
A changed team under Michal Bílek entered the Euro 2012 qualifiers and began with a home loss to Lithuania. But a win at home to Scotland was followed by wins against Liechtenstein. Spain defeated Czech Republic in between the Liechtenstein games, but the play-off spot was still in their hands. In the next game, a last minute penalty from Michal Kadlec away to Scotland secured a 2–2 draw. Despite Scotland winning their next two games and the Czechs again being defeated by Spain, the team could finish second if they could beat Lithuania away from home in the final game, assuming Spain would beat Scotland at home. Spain won 3–1 and Czech Republic defeated Lithuania 4–1 to seal second spot and a place in the play-offs. Czech Republic were drawn to face Montenegro in the two-legged play-off. A goal from Václav Pilař and a last minute second from Tomáš Sivok helped the Czechs to a 2–0 first leg lead. In the second leg in Podgorica, a late goal from Petr Jiráček sealed a 1–0 win and the Czechs ran out 3–0 aggregate winners and qualified for Euro 2012.

At the tournament, the Czechs lost their opening game 4–1 to Russia, with their only goal coming from Václav Pilař. In their second match, against Greece, the Czech Republic went 2–0 up within the first six minutes thanks to goals from Petr Jiráček and a second from Pilař. Following the half-time substitution of captain Tomáš Rosický, Greece scored a second-half goal following a mistake from Czech goalkeeper Petr Čech, although there were no more goals and the Czech Republic recorded their first win of the tournament. Going into their third and final group match, the Czech Republic needed at least a draw against co-hosts Poland to advance to the knock-out stage of the tournament. A second-half strike by Jiráček proved the difference between the teams as the Czechs ran out 1–0 winners. Due to Greece beating Russia in the other group game, the Czech Republic subsequently finished top of Group A, becoming the first team to ever win a group at the European Championships with a negative goal difference. The Czech team faced Portugal in the quarter-finals. Portugal eventually made the breakthrough with 11 minutes remaining through a header from Cristiano Ronaldo to win the match 1–0 and eliminate Czech Republic.

Bílek stayed on as coach, despite unrest amongst fans, and was tasked with qualifying for the 2014 World Cup. The Czechs were drawn into UEFA Qualifying Group B along with Italy, Denmark, Bulgaria, Armenia and Malta. The beginning of the campaign was  two goalless draws with Denmark and Bulgaria, paired with a narrow win against Malta, capping off their first three games. The team then lost 0–3 to Denmark at home. The team was able to win against Armenia and draw with group leaders Italy, but lost to both Armenia and Italy in the rematches. Bílek resigned after the loss and was replaced with assistant coach Josef Pešice. In their last two games with their new coach, the Czechs recorded wins over Malta and Bulgaria but lost to Italy, leaving them in third place and ending their qualification hopes. Pešice resigned as coach following the conclusion of qualifying.

Pavel Vrba was appointed as the team's new coach on the first day of 2014, ahead of Euro 2016 qualifying. The Czech team was drawn into Group A, along with Netherlands, Turkey, Iceland, Latvia and Kazakhstan. The Czech team began with a win, defeating Netherlands, and followed up with victories over Turkey, Kazakhstan and Iceland, leaving them as group leaders with maximum points after four matches. A draw at home against Latvia followed; nonetheless, Czech Republic remained group leader, and on 6 September 2015, qualified for their sixth European Championship. They only got one point from a draw with Croatia, losing to Spain and Turkey. During a friendly match against Australia on 1 June 2018, the Czechs recorded their biggest defeat losing 0–4 in Sankt Pölten, Austria. It was surpassed during their first qualifier for Euro 2020, as they were beaten 0–5 at Wembley Stadium by England.

Present in Group C during the 2018 World Cup qualifiers, the Czech Republic failed to qualify for the Russian World Cup as it finished in 3rd place with 4 wins, 3 draws and 3 defeats, behind directly qualified Germany and Northern Ireland, then unfortunate play-off.

On the other hand, they qualified directly for UEFA Euro 2021, finishing 2nd in Group A during the qualifiers, with a record of 5 wins and 3 defeats in 8 games. The team won a prestigious home match against England, the group leader (2–1) and lost all three away matches, in England (0–5), Kosovo (1–2) and Bulgaria (0–1). It is placed in Group D for the first round of the finals, placed under the sign of reunion: with England played in the qualifiers, Croatia present in the same group 4 years earlier in France, as well as Scotland played in the framework of the 2020–21 UEFA Nations League.

2020s
On November 18, 2020, the Czech Republic, then placed in Group 2 of League B in the 2020–2021 edition of the Nations League, obtained promotion to League A for the next edition thanks to a win at home against Slovakia on the last day of the group stages (2–0), allowing the Národní tým to overtake Scotland, which was defeated in Israel (0–1) at the same time. The team has a record of 4 wins and 2 losses (both in the first and second leg against Scotland, although the first leg in Prague was played by substitutes and U17-U19 players due to cases of COVID-19 affecting the regular starters).

The year 2021 starts on a positive note for the Czech Republic, which manages to catch Belgium at home (1–1) in the qualifiers for the 2022 World Cup. Above all, UEFA Euro 2021 saw the Národní tým realize a much better European campaign than the one in 2016 when they were quickly eliminated, finishing last in their group with only one point; as Jaroslav Šilhavý's men managed to get out of the group. Indeed, the Czech Republic won the first game against Scotland, who were playing at home, with a double from Patrik Schick (2–0), including a goal from more than 45 meters, lobbing the goalkeeper David Marshall who was too far forward on the second goal of the game, a technical gesture that made the world go round. It then gets a draw (1–1) against Croatia, finalist of the 2018 FIFA World Cup before losing on the last day against England at Wembley (0–1) with the assurance before the start of the game to be at worst among the 4 best 3rd of group and thus reach the last 16. The Czechs finished among the 4 best 3rd of the group with 4 points, ahead of Croatia, which has the same number of points and the same overall goal difference, but which inherited the 2nd place in the ranking at the expense of the Czechs since the Vatreni scored more goals (4 against 3). In the 1/8th finals, the Czech Republic faced the Netherlands, first of their group with 3 victories and mentioned among the favourites for the final victory. The Czech Republic made a great collective performance and created the surprise by winning 2–0 with goals from Tomáš Holeš (68th minute) and Patrik Schick (80th minute) while the Dutch team finished the game with 10 players, Matthijs de Ligt being sent off for a deliberate hand in the last defender's position, preventing a Czech goal opportunity just before the hour mark The Národní tým, returning to the quarterfinal stage for the first time since 2012, challenged Denmark for a place in the last four of the competition. Unfortunately, they were beaten 1–2, having conceded the first Danish goal after 5 minutes of play due to a refereeing error caused by a non-existent corner, and stopped at the gates of the semi-finals after a successful run. Patrik Schick was the Czech Republic's top scorer with 5 goals, as many as Cristiano Ronaldo at the finals, and both strikers finished as joint top scorers in the competition.

However, the Czech Republic failed to qualify for the World Cup in Qatar. The Czechs finished third in their group, behind Belgium and Wales, whom they failed to beat (home draw and away defeat in both cases), but they made it to the play-offs thanks to their position in the 2020–21 UEFA Nations League. They were eliminated in the semi-finals of the B lane, following an away defeat against Sweden in extra time (0–1, goal of Robin Quaison in the 110th minute).

Team image

Since 1994, the Czech Republic home kit has primarily been red shirts, with either blue or red shorts. While their away kit has been white shirts with white shorts. Although the team wore blue shorts for a short period between 2010 and 2011. In 2020 the team introduced a new alternate colour as the away kit for the first time.

Stadiums
Ten different cities hosted national team matches of the Czech Republic between 1994 and 2011. The most commonly-used stadium is Generali Arena, the home stadium of AC Sparta Prague. As of 3 June 2014, the team has played 36 of 92 home matches there. Since 2012, competitive games have also been held Doosan Arena, Plzeň.

Stadiums which have hosted Czech Republic international football matches:

Results and fixtures

2022

2023

Coaching staff

Coaching history

 Dušan Uhrin (1994–1997)
 Jozef Chovanec (1998–2001)
 Karel Brückner (2001–2008)
 Petr Rada (2008–2009)
 František Straka (2009)
 Ivan Hašek (2009)
 Michal Bílek (2009–2013)
 Josef Pešice (2013)
 Pavel Vrba (2014–2016)
 Karel Jarolím (2016–2018)
 Jaroslav Šilhavý (2018–)

Players

Current squad
The following squad was called up for the friendly matches against Faroe Islands and Turkey on 16 and 19 November 2022, respectively.

Caps and goals as of 19 November 2022, after the match against Turkey.

Recent call-ups
The following players have also been called up to the Czech Republic squad within the last twelve months:

 INJ = Withdrew due to an injury.
 PRE = Preliminary squad.
 RET = Retired from international football.
 WD = Withdrew due to non-injury related reasons.

Player statistics

Players in bold are still active with Czech Republic.
 This list does not include players that won caps for Czechoslovakia.

Most capped players

Top goalscorers

Competitive record

FIFA World Cup

UEFA European Championship

UEFA Nations League

FIFA Confederations Cup

Head-to-head record (since 1994)
As of 19 November 2022 after the match against .

Honours

 FIFA World Cup
 Runners-up (2): 1934, 1962
 UEFA European Championship
 Champions (1): 1976
 Runners-up (1): 1996
 Third place (3): 1960, 1980, 2004
 FIFA Confederations Cup
 Third place (1): 1997
 Olympic Games
 Gold medal (1): 1980
 Silver medal (1): 1964

See also

Football in Czech Republic
Czech Republic national football team results (1994–2019)
Czech Republic national under-21 football team
Czech Republic national under-19 football team
Czech Republic national under-18 football team
Czech Republic national under-17 football team

Notes

References

External links

Official website 
FIFA profile
UEFA profile
RSSSF archive of results 1994–
RSSSF archive of results 1903,1906–08,1939
RSSSF archive of most capped players and highest goalscorers

1994 establishments in the Czech Republic
 
European national association football teams